Omneya Abdel Kawy (born 15 August 1985, in Cairo) is a former professional squash player from Egypt.

Career
Omneya crowned a successful junior career in 2003 in her home city of Cairo when she became the first Egyptian woman to win a world junior title having won the 2003 World Junior Championship; she had previously been the runner up to Nicol David in 1999 and 2001. Such was already competing on the WISPA Tour during her mid teens.

She reached number seven in the world rankings early in 2005 and achieved match ball against world number one Rachael Grinham in the final of the Hurghada International in her home country, though she eventually lost the match. She also reached another two finals, in the Harrow, Greenwich Open and the Dayton Open, both in the United States, and finished as a runner up. Omneya then won the Marsh McLennan title by beating Vicky Botwright.

2006 saw Omneya avenge the Hurghada International loss the previous year when she turned the tables in a pulsating final to win the event in front of her home supporters. In 2007, she won the Dayton Open by beating Jaclyn Hawkes of New Zealand with a score of  9–5, 9–5, 3–9 and 9–5.

She became the first Egyptian woman to break into the world top 4 and was the first Egyptian woman to reach a world individual final at the 2010 Women's World Open Squash Championship. In 2012, she was part of the team that regained the world team title after winning a gold medal at the 2012 Women's World Team Squash Championships.

In 2014, she was part of the Egyptian team that won the bronze medal at the 2014 Women's World Team Squash Championships.

In 2016, she won her third world team title as part of the Egyptian team that won the gold medal at the 2016 Women's World Team Squash Championships.

In 2018, she announced her retirement from squash.

World Open

Finals: 1 (0 title, 1 runner-up)

Major World Series final appearances

Hong Kong Open: 1 final (0 title, 1 runner-up)

External links

References 

Egyptian female squash players
1985 births
Living people
World Games bronze medalists
Competitors at the 2005 World Games
Competitors at the 2009 World Games
African Games gold medalists for Egypt
African Games medalists in squash
Competitors at the 2003 All-Africa Games
21st-century Egyptian women